Erasyl Abilqasymov (Erasyl Äbılqasymov; born 28 July 1948) is a retired Kazakh politician who served as a member of the Mazhilis from 2001 to 2007. He was a candidate for the Communist People's Party of Kazakhstan (QKHP) in the 2005 Kazakh presidential election.

Early life and education 
Abilqasymov was born in the village of Bostan in Almaty Region. In 1967, he graduated from the Talgar Medical School as a medical assistant then in 1972 from the Kazakh National Medical University with a degree in healthcare organization. In 1987, Abilqasymov finished Al-Farabi Kazakh National University where he learned history. He earned his doctorate in medical sciences in 1996 with the thesis topic: "Historical, theoretical and organizational and economic foundations of the introduction of the compulsory health insurance system in the Republic of Kazakhstan".

Early career 
From 1972, Abilqasymov was a research assistant at the Kazakh National Medical University. In 1973, he became a trainee researcher at the Moscow State University of Medicine and Dentistry and from 1974, as a senior laboratory assistant at the Kazakh National Medical University. From 1983 to 1987, Abilqasymov worked as the Deputy Head of the Personnel Department and Educational Institutions, Head of the Personnel Department, Head of the Planning and Financial Department of the Ministry of Health of the Kazakh SSR. In 1988, he became the chief physician of the Alma-Ata City Self-Supporting Consultative and Diagnostic Polyclinic until 1991, when becoming the chief physician of the Republican Self-Supporting Scientific and Practical Center of Oriental and Modern Medicine. While working there, Abilqasymov was the leading and chief researcher at the Kazakhstan Academy of Sciences from 1995. In 1999, he was appointed as the Head of the laboratory, and the Director of the Scientific Center for Medical and Economic Problems of Health Care.

Political career

Member of the Mazhilis 
In 2001, Abilqasymov became a member of the Mazhilis. From there, he was a member of Committee for Social and Cultural Development. He was reelected in 2004 from the 18th Taldykorgan Constituency of the Almaty Region and was a member of the Committee on International Affairs, Defense and Security until 2007. Abilqasymov was one of the well-known Mazhilis member, who sharply criticized the actions of the government, made populist statements and was very popular with journalists who often gave interviews with.

2005 presidential campaign 

While serving as parliamentarian, Abilqasymov was unanimously chosen to be the first-ever presidential nominee for the Communist People's Party of Kazakhstan (QKHP) during the 2005 presidential election on 17 September 2005. He campaigned around the topic of fighting corruption. Abilqasymov himself doubted that he would win the race but hoped that he'd secure Zharmakhan Tuyakbay's spot and finish in 2nd place. However, he won 0.34% of the vote and took 4th place in the race, behind Alikhan Baimenov.

Post-Mazhilis career 
After his term as a Mazhilis member ended, Abilqasymov, on 13 August 2007, during a live TV broadcast, he called on people to support the pro-government party Nur Otan in the race. As a result, Abilqasymov was excluded from the Communist People's Party of Kazakhstan by its leaders.

In 2012, he became the Chairman of the Board of Directors of JSC Dzharbusynov Scientific Center of Urology and is currently managing his own medical companies.

Personal life 
Abilqasymov is married to Alma Abilqasymova, doctor of pedagogical sciences, professor, academician of the IAS HS. He has 3 children which two of his sons are Almaz (born 1977), Maqsat (born 1983). Abiqasymov's daughter Madina Abilqasymova (born 1978) served as a Minister of Labour and Social Protection of the Population from 2018 to 2019.

References 

1948 births
Living people
People from Almaty Region
Members of the Mazhilis
Al-Farabi Kazakh National University alumni